Clifford Marshall Thompson (October 18, 1904 – October 15, 1955) was one of the world's tallest men, and remains the tallest man to ever appear in a Hollywood film.

Born in Rugby, North Dakota, as a child Thompson moved with his parents to Scandinavia, Wisconsin. He claimed to be  and weigh .

He was known as "The Scandinavian Giant," "The Wisconsin Paul Bunyan," and "Count Olaf". Thompson appeared in many Hollywood films, including A Day in the Life of a Giant and Seal Skins. Later he enrolled in Marquette University and earned a law degree.

A biography of Robert Pershing Wadlow recites that Thompson made a challenge to Wadlow to come to his hometown to prove that Wadlow was just 'another faker'. When both men walked on stage, Wadlow held out his arm and Thompson was easily under it. To which Wadlow replied "When you grow up you will be an awfully big boy."

References

1904 births
1955 deaths
People with gigantism
Marquette University alumni
People from Rugby, North Dakota
People from Scandinavia, Wisconsin